AS Marca FC is a football club of East Timor based in Díli. The team plays in the Liga Futebol Amadora Terceira Divisão.

History

2019

Foundation
Formed in 2019 for the LFA Terceira Divisão dispute, the teams debuted on November 8 playing against the YMCA FC team for the first round of the competition.

Promotion
With three wins and a draw, the AS Marca FC team achieved the best campaign in group B and was promoted to LFA Segunda together with the team Emmanuel FC, first place in group A.

2020
In 2020, due to the COVID-19 pandemic, the Liga Futeból Timor-Leste (LFTL) held only 2 official competitions: the 2020 Taça 12 de Novembro and the 2020 Copa FFTL. 2020 Copa FFTL was a way found by the FFTL to replace the LFA Primeira, LFA Segunda competitions.

Copa FFTL
Copa FFTL included all eight LFA Primeira teams and 12 LFA Segunda teams.

AS Marca FC participated in the competition for having won the promotion to LFA Segunda in 2019.

The team debuted in the competition on August 30, 2020 against the AS Ponta Leste team and got scared, AS Ponta Leste won 7–0.

Despite the bad debut, ASMARCA ended up recovering and finished the group stage in second place, thus achieving the classification for the next stage.

However, the team was not so lucky in the quarter-finals and ended up eliminated from the competition after losing to the Lalenok United team by the score of 6–0.

Competition records

Liga Futebol Amadora 
LFA Terceira 2019: 1st places in Groub B

Links 

 Facebook: https://www.facebook.com/asmarca2019/

References

Football clubs in East Timor
Football
Association football clubs established in 2019